Herbert Place (October 1882 – 4 November 1928) was an English professional rugby league footballer who played in the 1900s, 1910s and 1920s.

Early life and family
Place was born in Hunslet, Leeds, to Arthur Place, a boot repairer, and Jane Hawden. He was baptised Methodist at three weeks old. He married Sarah Emma Storer in 1903 and had a son, John Arthur Place, the next year. He later worked in the same profession as his father.

Playing career
Place made his début for Hunslet in 1900, and went on to make over 400 appearances for the club.

International honours
Herbert Place won a cap for England while at Hunslet in 1909 against Wales.

Challenge Cup Final appearances
Herbert Place played  in Hunslet's 14-0 victory over Hull F.C. in the 1908 Challenge Cup Final during the 1907–08 season at Fartown Ground, Huddersfield on Saturday 25 April 1908, in front of a crowd of 18,000.

County Cup Final appearances
Place played  in Hunslet's 13-3 victory over Halifax in the 1905 Yorkshire County Cup Final during the 1905–06 season at Park Avenue, Bradford on Saturday 2 December 1905, in front of a crowd of 18,500, and played  in the 17-0 victory over Halifax in the 1907 Yorkshire County Cup Final during the 1907–08 season at Headingley Rugby Stadium, Leeds on Saturday 21 December 1907, in front of a crowd of 15,000.

All Four Cups
Place was a member of Hunslet's 1907–08 All Four Cups winning team.

References

1882 births
1928 deaths
England national rugby league team players
English rugby league players
Hunslet F.C. (1883) players
Date of birth missing
Rugby league fullbacks
Rugby league players from Leeds
Rugby league wingers